The Lithuanian Hall, also known as Lithuanian Music Hall,  is the home of the Lithuanian Music Hall Association.  It is a private club and cultural organization located in Philadelphia, Pennsylvania and serves as a recreation center and meeting house for social events, including dances, weddings, musical events, art exhibits, and cultural events.  The hall was founded to serve the needs of the Lithuanian community in Philadelphia, Pennsylvania.

References

External links
Lithuanian Music Hall Association official website

1907 establishments in Pennsylvania
Clubs and societies in the United States
Culture of Philadelphia
Dance venues in the United States
History of Philadelphia
Lithuanian-American culture in Pennsylvania
Music venues in Pennsylvania
Organizations based in Philadelphia
Organizations established in 1907